Linus is a male given name.

Linus may also refer to:

Music
 Linus (band), an indie/riot grrrl band
 Linus Pauling Quartet, a Houston psychedelic rock band
 Linus Entertainment, a Canadian record label
 (Like) Linus, the Deftones' first demo tape
 Linus (opera), one of the lost operas by Jean-Philippe Rameau

People
 Linus (Argive), son of Apollo and Psamathe in Greek mythology
 Linus (deejay) (Pasquale Di Molfetta, born 1957), Italian radio host
 Linus of Hollywood (Linus Dotson, born 1973), American musical artist
 Linus of Thrace, musician and master of eloquent speech in Greek mythology
 Linus Pauling (1901–1994), American chemist and winner of two Nobel Prizes (chemistry and peace)
 Pope Linus (died c. 76), second Bishop of Rome and Pope of the Catholic Church
 Linus Torvalds, creator and lead developer of the Linux kernel

Science and technology
 LINUS (fusion experiment), an experimental reactor built in 1972
 Linus (moon), a moon of asteroid 22 Kalliope
 Linus, a genus of jumping spiders
 Winter Storm Linus, a 2014–2015 storm

Other uses
 Linus (magazine), an Italian magazine published since 1965
 Linus (Peanuts), a character in the Charles Schulz comic strip Peanuts
 Linus (Mysia), a town of ancient Mysia, now in Turkey
 Linus Airways, a regional airline in Indonesia that ceased operations in 2009

See also
 
 Linos (disambiguation)